Peter Blair may refer to:

 Peter Blair (wrestler) (1932–1994), American sport wrestler and naval officer
 Peter Hunter Blair (1912–1982), English academic and historian